Per-Ivar Steinbakk (born 15 May 1974) is a retired Norwegian football defender.

He came through the junior ranks of FK Bodø/Glimt into the first team in 1995. Playing about half the games in three Eliteserien seasons, he joined lowly Narvik FK in 1998. He played second-tier football for FK Lofoten and Lørenskog IF before taking a second spell in Bodø/Glimt, and finishing his career in local minnows Innstrandens IL.

References

1974 births
Living people
Norwegian footballers
FK Bodø/Glimt players
FK Lofoten players
Lørenskog IF players
Eliteserien players
Norwegian First Division players
Association football midfielders